Serge Augier (born in 1969) is heir to the Taoist Tradition "Ba Men Da Xuan", author of books and articles on Taoism in French and English, and the primary subject of the book "Warrior Guards the Mountain: The Internal Martial Traditions of China, Japan and South East Asia". 
He is known for his teaching of Traditional Chinese Medicine and martial arts, particularly the Chinese Internal styles (Neijia), including Zi Ran Men (Tzu Ja Men, 自然門 zìránmén), T'ai Chi Ch'uan (太極拳 tàijí quán), Hsing I Ch'uan (形意拳 xíng Yì Quán), Bagua (Baguazhang, 八卦掌 bà guà zhǎng) and Taoist  Qigong (chi kung, chi gung, 氣功 qìgōng). He has been an invited speaker at InreesTv where he was interviewed by the famous French writer and former war-correspondent Stéphane Allix on the origin and practice of Taoism.

Serge Augier was the subject of two documentaries on the clan Taoist arts, from the Warrior Guards the Mountain series by Line of Intent. In 2017 he gave an in-depth interview for Falcon Books. In 2019, Serge Augier was interviewed on the national CBC radio program, ICI Radio-Canada.

Published Books

In French 

  (Practical Encyclopedia of the Tao)

In English 

 Ba Zi - The Four Pillars of Destiny: Understanding Character, Relationships and Potential Through Chinese Astrology
 Shen Gong and Nei Dan in Da Xuan: A Manual for Working with Mind, Emotion, and Internal Energy
 Urban Violence: Mian Xiang for Self Defence
 Daoist Boxing: The Authentic Transmission of Internal Martial Arts
 Eight Principles for Happiness
 Dao De Jing For Actual Transformation
 Seasonal Nei Gong

References

Living people
1969 births
French Taoists
French spiritual writers
Martial arts trainers
Acupuncturists
Traditional Chinese medicine practitioners